VRIO is a business analysis framework that forms part of a firm's larger strategic scheme, proposed by Jay Barney in 1991. The basic strategic process that any firm begins with a vision statement, and continues on through objectives, internal & external analysis, strategic choices (both business-level and corporate-level), and strategic implementation.

VRIO falls into the internal analysis step of these procedures, but is used as a framework in evaluating just about all resources and capabilities of a firm, regardless of what phase of the strategic model it falls under.

VRIO is an initialism for the four question framework asked about a resource or capability to determine its competitive potential: the question of Value, the question of Rarity, the question of Imitability (Ease/Difficulty to Imitate), and the question of Organization (ability to exploit the resource or capability).
The question of value: "Is the firm able to exploit an opportunity or neutralize an external threat with the resource/capability?"
The question of rarity: "Is control of the resource/capability in the hands of a relative few?"
The question of imitability: "Is it difficult to imitate, and will there be significant cost disadvantage to a firm trying to obtain, develop, or duplicate the resource/capability?"
The question of organization: "Is the firm organized, ready, and able to exploit the resource/capability?" "Is the firm organized to capture value?"

Question of value 

The basic question asked by the V in the VRIO framework for internal analysis is “Is this resource or capability valuable to the firm?” In this case, the definition of value is whether or not the resource or capability works to exploit an opportunity or mitigate a threat in the marketplace. If it does do one of those two things, it can be considered a strength of the company. However, if it does not work to exploit an opportunity or mitigate a threat, it is a weakness. Occasionally, some resources or capabilities could be considered strengths in one industry and weaknesses in a different one. Six common examples of opportunities firms could attempt to exploit are:
 technological change,
 demographic change,
 cultural change,
 economic climate,
 specific international events,
 legal and political conditions.
Furthermore, five threats that a resource or capability could mitigate are:
 the threat of buyers,
 threat of suppliers,
 threat of entry,
 threat of rivalry,
 threat of substitutes.

Generally, this exploitation of opportunity or mitigation of threat will result in one of two more outcomes: an increase in revenues or a decrease in costs (or both).

A great way to identify possibly valuable resources or capabilities is by looking into the company's value chain. In the value chain, a business develops its products and services step-by-step, with each function along the way adding some sort of value to the product or service. The choices a firm makes regarding its value chain (including how to operate, and which steps to operate in) is closely tied to the firms resources and capabilities, therefore making it a valuable tool in identifying value in resources and capabilities. If some asset that the company has allows it to operate more effectively in a certain portion of the value chain, chances are that resource will be considered valuable by the VRIO framework.

Question of rarity 

Having rarity in a firm can lead to competitive advantage.  Rarity is when a firm has a valuable resource or capability that is absolutely unique among a set of current and potential competitors.
How to determine if the company's resource is rare and creates competitive advantage?
A firm's resources and capabilities must be both short in supply and persist over time to be a source of sustained competitive advantage.  If both elements (short supply and persistence over time) aren't met, then the resources and capabilities a firm has can't be a sustained competitive advantage. If a resource is not rare, then perfect competition dynamics are likely to be observed.
Example of Rarity – A janitor who defines his/her job as helping the firm make and sell better products instead of just referring to their job as simply cleaning up facilities is quite unusual.  Most individuals would agree that this firm has a source of competitive advantage over other firms in their industry because their objectives and strategies are transparent throughout the entire firm; unlike many other firms where only top tier management is the only group that believes in their objectives and strategies (Barney & Hesterly, 2011). this raity lead to fight in the competition.

Question of imitability 

The primary question of “imitability” asked in the VRIO framework in internal analysis is that “ Do firms without a resource or capability face a cost disadvantage in obtaining or developing it compared to firms that already possess it?” Firms with valuable and rare resources, which are hard to imitate by other firms, can gain the first-mover advantages in the market and can hence gain competitive advantage.

A firm can either exploit an external opportunity or neutralize an external threat by using its rare and valuable resources. In this case, the firm can gain competitive advantage. When the firm's competitors discover this competitive advantage, they may respond in two ways. First, they can choose to ignore the profit gaining by the competitive advantage and continue to operate in their old ways. Second, they can choose to analyze and duplicate the competitive strategy of its rival. If there is no cost or little cost in obtaining this rare and valuable resource, the fellow firms can imitate the competitive advantage in order to gain competitive parity (firms that create the same economic value as their rivals experience competitive parity). However, sometimes it is hard for other firms to get access to the resources and imitate the innovative company's strategy. As a result, the innovative companies that implement its strategies based on costly-to-imitate and valuable resources can gain long-term competitive advantage, which ensures a company's sustained success (Hill & Jones, 1998). Hence, to sustain the competitive advantage, it is not sufficient for a firm's resources and capabilities to be valuable and rare – they should also be mostly inimitable.

Forms of imitation 

In most cases, imitation appears in two ways, direct duplication or substitution. After observing other firms’ competitive advantage, a firm can directly imitate the resource possessed by the innovative firm. If the cost to imitate is high, the competitive advantage will be sustained. If not, the competitive advantage will be temporary. Otherwise, an imitating firm can attempt to use a substitute in order to gain similar competitive advantage of the innovative firm.

Cost of imitation 

Cost of imitation is usually high in order to gain a competitive advantage due to the following reasons:
 Unique Historical Conditions – an innovative firm gains low-cost access to rare resources in a particular time and space,
 Causal Ambiguity – an imitating firm cannot tell the factors that lead to the competitive advantage of an innovative firm,
 Social Complexity – when the resources involved in gaining competitive advantage is based on interpersonal relationship, culture and other social background,
 Patents – a source of long-term competitive advantage certificated by authority in a few industries such as pharmaceuticals.

Question of organization 
Once the analyst has realized the value, rarity and imitability of the company's resources and capabilities, the next step is to organize the company in a way to exploit these resources. If done successfully, the company can enjoy a period of sustained competitive advantage. There are many components to this question of organization. They include, but are not limited to, the company's formal reporting structure, management control systems and compensation policies. Formal reporting structures are simply a description of who in the firm reports to whom. Management control systems include both formal and informal means to make sure that managers’ decisions align with a firm's strategies. Formal control systems can consist of budgeting and reporting activities that keep top management informed of decisions made by employee's lower down in the firm. Informal controls can include a company's culture and encouraging employees to monitor each other. Firms incentivize their employees to behave a desired way through compensation policies. These policies can include bonuses, stocks or salary increases but can also include non-monetary incentives such as additional vacation days or a larger office. These components of organization are known as complementary capabilities and resources because alone they do not provide much value. However, in combination with a firm's other resources and capabilities, it can result in sustained competitive advantage. Without the correct organization, even firms with valuable, rare and costly to imitate resources and capabilities can suffer competitive disadvantage (Barney & Hesterly, 2011).

See also 
 PEST analysis
 SWOT analysis
 Management
 Strategic management
 Strategic planning
 System dynamics
 Resource-based view

References 

 Barney, Jay B and Hesterly, William S. Strategic Management and Competitive Advantage: Concepts. 2005 Pearson Education, Inc., Upper Saddle River, New Jersey, 07458.
 Strategic Management Journal, 5, pp. 171–180. Barney, J.B. (1991). “Firm resources and sustained competitive advantage.” Journal of Management, 19, pp. 99–120.
 Hill, C.W.L., and G.R. Jones (1998). Strategic Management Theory: An Integrated Approach, 4th. Boston: Houghton Mifflin.
 Barney, J. B., & Hesterly, W. S. (2010). VRIO Framework. In Strategic Management and Competitive Advantage (pp. 68–86). New Jersey: Pearson.

Business intelligence terms
Strategic management
Management theory